Transparent Horizon is a 1975 black Cor-ten steel sculpture by Louise Nevelson, installed on the Massachusetts Institute of Technology campus, in Cambridge, Massachusetts, United States. The artwork was among the first funded by MIT's "Percent-For-Art" program, which allocates $500,000 for art commissions for new architectural renovations on campus. The sculpture is an amalgam of two of Nevelson's previous works, Tropical Tree IV and Black Flower Series IV.  The sculpture has been the target of vandalism.

References

External links
 Transparent Horizon, 1975 at cultureNOW

1975 sculptures
Massachusetts Institute of Technology campus
Outdoor sculptures in Cambridge, Massachusetts
Steel sculptures in Massachusetts
Vandalized works of art in Massachusetts